The Chinese Ceramic Society (abbreviated  CCS) of Beijing is a Chinese non-profit professional body and learned society in the field of Chinese ceramics with a focus on scientific research, emerging technologies, and applications in which ceramic materials are an element. It was established in 1945. As of 2018, the society has 21 specialized committees and 3 working committees with more than 20,000 individual members.

History
The Chinese Ceramic Society started in 1945 as a research group in southwest China's Chongqing city. In January 1951 this group became the "China Kiln Engineering Society", but was closed down in October. In December 1956, the "Preparatory Committee of China Silicates Society" was founded in Beijing, and in November 1959 the name was changed to the "Chinese Ceramic Society".

Scientific publishing
 Journal of Materiomics

References

External links
 

Ceramic engineering
Ceramic materials
Glass engineering and science
Materials science organizations
Scientific organizations established in 1945
Organizations based in Beijing
1945 establishments in China